Kuwait is part of the Tigris–Euphrates river system basin. Several Tigris–Euphrates confluences form parts of the Kuwait–Iraq border. Bubiyan Island is part of the Shatt al-Arab delta. Kuwait is partially part of the Mesopotamian Marshes. Kuwait does not currently have any permanent rivers within its territory. However, Kuwait does have several wadis, the most notable of which is Wadi al-Batin which forms the border between Kuwait and Iraq. Kuwait also has several river-like marine channels around Bubiyan Island, most notably Khawr Abd Allah which is now an estuary, but once was the point where the Shatt al-Arab emptied into the Persian Gulf. Khawr Abd Allah is located in southern Iraq and northern Kuwait, the Iraq-Kuwait border divides the lower portion of the estuary, but adjacent to the port of Umm Qasr the estuary becomes wholly Iraqi. It forms the northeast coastline of Bubiyan Island and the north coastline of Warbah Island.

Wadis
Bahrat al Abraq
Bahrat al Mirfi
Shaib Rujm al Jahtan
Wadi al Batin (Kuwait River)

Marine Channels of Bubiyan Island
Khawr abd Allah
Khawr Bubiyan
Khawr az Zubayr
Khawr as Subiyah
Khawr al Tha'aleb

References

Kuwait
Rivers